Hydroxynorephedrine may refer to:

 meta-Hydroxynorephedrine
 para-Hydroxynorephedrine